This list of governors of North Kivu includes governors of the North Kivu province of the Democratic Republic of the Congo in the period from 1962 to 1966 when it was split out from the province of Kivu, and in the period from 1988 onward when it was again separate from Kivu.

First period (1962–1966)

The governors were:

Second period (1988 – present)

The governors were:

See also

 Lists of provincial governors of the Democratic Republic of the Congo
 List of governors of Kivu

References

North Kivu
Governors of provinces of the Democratic Republic of the Congo